Turney may refer to:

People 

Turney (surname)

Other 

 Turney, Missouri, village in Clinton County, Missouri, United States
 Turney Ranch Formation, a Mesozoic geologic formation, Dinosaur